Pete Wagner (born January 26, 1955) is an American political cartoonist, activist, author, scholar and caricature artist whose work has been published in over 300 newspapers and other periodicals. His cartoons and activist theatrics have been the subject of controversy and frequent media attention.

Early life
Originally from a working-class neighborhood Bay View, Milwaukee, Wisconsin, who also lived and worked in Madison, Wisconsin and Minneapolis, Minnesota.
While attending Bay View High School, he initiated recycling programs, conducted roadside litter cleanups and successfully fought the test-marketing of a non-biodegradable container by the Morton Salt company through the Milwaukee City Council between 1969 and 1972. He continued working as an environmental activist at the University of Wisconsin-Milwaukee, where he worked with Mike Walker to oppose energy waste. Wagner was a speaker for Zero Population Growth, Inc. from 1973 through 1975 in Milwaukee and Minneapolis. He served as co-chair of the Benjamin Spock for president campaign in 1972.

Wagner is best known as a political cartoonist. He was staff editorial cartoonist for his high school newspaper, the Bay View Oracle, in 1969–72, and a number of alternative media, college, neighborhood and special interest newspapers and magazines starting in 1972, including the UWM Post (1972–74 and 1976), the Marquette Tribune (1973–75) Minnesota Daily (1974–76 and 1997–2002), MPIRG Statewatch (1979–1987), Republican News (1974-75), Hustler magazine (1977–78), Minnesota Tenants Union newspaper (1979–82), Elliot Park, Minneapolis Surveyor (1981–84), Gay-Lesbian Community Voice (1979–93), Bulletin of the Atomic Scientists (1985–87), City Pages (1982–92), Madison Press Connection (1978) and others. Wagner's mentors were Bill Sanders of the Milwaukee Journal, Herb Block of the Washington Post, and Ross Lewis, retired Milwaukee Journal cartoonist.

Cartooning career
Wagner was influenced by Sanders to work in an acerbic, hard-hitting style of political cartooning with connections to punk subculture. His main goal is "to get people to focus on an issue and provoke a response", he said in 1999. Despite the uncompromising tone, several of the public figures featured in his cartoons asked for copies of the drawing for themselves or their office, such as Minnesota Governor Rudy Perpich, University of Wisconsin-Milwaukee J. Martin Klotsche, United States Senator Paul Wellstone and one mayor of Madison.

Wagner's political cartoons were syndicated by the Collegiate Press Service from 1973 to 1976, but also by large-circulation publications such as Time magazine and The Washington Post, as well asThe Progressive, In These Times, High Times and, briefly in 1977, Hustler magazine.

Wagner's cartoons won a national Society of Professional Journalists award in 1976 for a cartoon drawn while at the Minnesota Daily, six more SPJ awards between 1985 and 1991 for cartoons drawn while at City Pages, an honorable mention in the John Fischetti competition and several Minnesota Newspaper Association awards, also while at City Pages. One of his cartoons was shown in an exhibit at the Whitney Museum of Art in New York.

As of 2021, he still works as a caricature artist performing at private events, as an entertainer and drawing commissioned pieces from photographs.

Activism

Wagner described himself in the 1970s and 1980s as "an activist who also happens to be a cartoonist". He frequently used guerrilla theatre that fueled controversies. He protested speaking engagements by many leading conservative of the time, such as Anita Bryant, Ronald Reagan and Jerry Falwell in ways that attracted media attention. He ran for student president of the University of Minnesota in 1976, under the "Tupperware Party".

Several of his protests were organized with the same group of people, which he named The Brain Trust. The final action of the group, an unthemed protest to which several thousand people were invited to bring their own issues, took place in 1982. The protest inspired one in the same style in Denver later in the Summer.

Wagner's political activism also has taken the form of multimedia political comedy shows, one of which toured 33 colleges in the late 1970s and early 1980s. He also edited a local humor magazine called "Minne HA! HA! - The Twin Cities' Sorely Needed Humor Magazine" sporadically between 1978 and 1993).

In more recent years, Wagner has worked with Minneapolis environmental activist Leslie Davis, joining Davis as his running mate in Davis' bid for governor of Minnesota in 2002.

Books
Wagner, Pete, Buy This Book. A Charter Member of the Slandered Seventies Sticks up for the Me Generation, 1980.
Wagner, Pete, "Buy This Too". 1987.

See also 
Peter Wagner (disambiguation)

References 

1955 births
American editorial cartoonists
University of Minnesota alumni
Living people
Artists from Milwaukee
Yippies